Eunatalis porcata is a species of Cleridae that occurs in Australia

References

 

Cleridae
Beetles of Australia
Beetles described in 1787